Rock Island may refer to:

 islets known as rocks or rock islands

Places 
 Rock Island Township (disambiguation)

Canada

Islands 
 Rock Island (Nunavut)
 Rock Islands (Lake Nipissing), an island in Ontario

Communities 
 Rock Island, Quebec, a community within the ville of Stanstead

United States 
 Rock Island II Site, Rock Island, Door County, Wisconsin; an archaeological site

Lakes
 Rock Island Lake, Elmore County, Idaho; a lake
 Rock Island Pool, Washington State; a reservoir lake

Islands 
 Rock Island (Lake County, Montana), an island in Flathead Lake
 Rock Island (Sanders County, Montana), an island in Noxon Reservoir
 Rock Island (New York) on the Saint Lawrence River
 Rock Island (Oregon), in the Willamette River
 Rock Island (Rhode Island)
 Rock Island (Wisconsin)
 Rock Island State Park (Wisconsin)

Communities 
 Rock Island, Florida
 Rock Island, Illinois, largest city in the U.S. with that name
 Davenport-Moline-Rock Island, a multi-state conurbation
 Rock Island County, Illinois
 Rock Island Arsenal, Illinois
 Rock Island, Oklahoma
 Rock Island, Tennessee
 Rock Island, Colorado County, Texas
 Rock Island, Washington County, Texas
 Glenrio, New Mexico and Texas, once Rock Island, Deaf Smith County, Texas
 Rock Island, Washington

Elsewhere 
 Rock Island (Ireland)
 Rock Islands, Palau
 Rock Island (Trinidad and Tobago)

Transportation
 Rock Island Depot (disambiguation)
 Rock Island Bridge (disambiguation)
 Chicago, Rock Island and Pacific Railroad, a railway company, known as the Rock Island Line
 1894 Rock Island railroad wreck, a train sabotage which killed 11 near Lincoln, Nebraska
 Rock Island Snow Plow No. 95580, a railway plow
 Rock Island 886, a steam locomotive
 Rock Island District, a commuter rail line in Chicago
 Rock Island Light (Rock Island) a lighthouse on the Saint-Lawrence River, in Jefferson, County, New York State, USA

Film and television
 Rock Island Mysteries, a 2022 Australian children's drama TV series

Music
 Rock Island 2002, a music event held in 2002 on the Isle of Wight

Albums
 Rock Island (Jethro Tull album)
 Rock Island (Palm album)

Songs
 "Rock Island Line", a blues/folk song by Leadbelly
 "Rock Island", a song from the musical The Music Man

Other uses 
 Rock Island State Park (disambiguation)
 Rock Island Trail (disambiguation)
 Rock Island High School, Rock Island, Illinois, USA
 Rock Island Arsenal, Rock Island, Illinois, USA; historic arsenal on Mississippi River
 Rock Island Arsenal Museum
 Rock Island National Cemetery
 Rock Island Islanders, Rock Island, Illinois, USA; a minor league baseball team

See also

 Rock Island Line (disambiguation)
 Rock Island M200, pistol
 Battle of Rock Island Rapids (War of 1812) in Illinois
 Hurd v. Rock Island Bridge Co. (1857) a law case fought by lawyer Abraham Lincoln
 
 
 Island (disambiguation)
 Rock (disambiguation)
 The Rock (disambiguation), including islands known as "The Rock(s)"
 Rocky Island (disambiguation)